Dactylorhiza foliosa, the Madeira orchid or leafy orchid, is a species of flowering plant in the family Orchidaceae, endemic to the Portuguese Island of Madeira in the eastern Atlantic Ocean.

This plant has gained the Royal Horticultural Society's Award of Garden Merit (confirmed 2017).

Synonyms
Orchis foliosa Sol. ex Lowe (1831), illegitimate homonym, not Sw. 1800 nor Masson ex Ker Gawl. 1819 nor Spreng. 1826 nor Schur 1866
Orchis latifolia var. foliosa Rchb.f. (1851) 
Dactylorchis orientalis subsp. foliosa (Rchb.f.) Klinge (1898)
Orchis orientalis subsp. foliosa (Rchb.f.) Klinge (1898)
Dactylorchis foliosa (Rchb.f.) Verm. (1947)
Orchis maderensis Summerh. (1947 publ. 1948)
Dactylorhiza incarnata subsp. foliosa (Rchb.f.) H.Sund. (1975)

Gallery

References

External links
Czech Botany, Dactylorhiza foliosa(Rchb. f.) Soó – Madeiran Orchid
Alpine Garden Society
IOSPE orchid photos, Dactylorhiza foliosa (Sol. ex E.N. Lowe) Soó 1962 Photo courtesy of R. Buscail and the Orchids of France and Europe

foliosa
Flora of Madeira
Endemic flora of Madeira
Orchids of Europe
Plants described in 1851